Stephen DeRoux (born 3 December 1983 in Saint Mary) is a Jamaican footballer.

Career

College
DeRoux played college soccer at Prince George's Community College, in Largo, Maryland, where he was a NSCAA Second Team All-American in 2002.

Professional
DeRoux signed a developmental contract with D.C. United on 15 September 2005, and subsequently played in 10 games for the team, but following the conclusion of the 2007 season, United did not exercise DeRoux's contract option. Although he was invited to rejoin United during the 2008 pre-season training camp to attempt to re-earn a roster spot, he was not offered a contract with the team.

DeRoux spent the 2008 season with Minnesota Thunder in the USL First Division, playing 29 games and scoring 1 goal, before moving to Montreal Impact in 2009. During the 2009 USL season DeRoux contributed by helping the Impact clinch a playoff spot under new head coach Marc Dos Santos. He was also selected to the All-League Second Team of the Year. He helped the Impact reach the finals where Montreal would face the Vancouver Whitecaps FC, this marking the first time in USL history where the final match would consist of two Canadian clubs. In the final DeRoux helped the Impact win the series 6–3 on aggregate. The victory gave the Impact their third USL Championship and also the victory marked his first USL Championship. On 6 October 2009 DeRoux received the Newcomer of the Year Award during the team's 2009 awards banquet.

On 12 January 2011, Montreal Impact technical director Nick De Santis confirmed on CKAC that DeRoux would not be back with the Impact for the 2011 season.

DeRoux joined Florida Tropics SC on 20 May 2019.

Honors

Montreal Impact
USL First Division Championship (1): 2009

Career stats

References

External links
 Montreal Impact bio
 

1983 births
Living people
Baltimore Blast (2008–2014 MISL) players
D.C. United players
Expatriate soccer players in Canada
Expatriate soccer players in the United States
Association football midfielders
Jamaican expatriate footballers
Jamaican expatriate sportspeople in Canada
Jamaican expatriate sportspeople in the United States
Jamaican footballers
Major League Soccer players
Major Indoor Soccer League (2008–2014) players
Minnesota Thunder players
Montreal Impact (1992–2011) players
North American Soccer League players
People from Saint Mary Parish, Jamaica
Puerto Rico Islanders players
San Antonio Scorpions players
USL First Division players
USSF Division 2 Professional League players
People from Largo, Maryland
Indy Eleven players
Major Arena Soccer League players
Utica City FC players
Florida Tropics SC players